Already Dead may also refer to:

 Already Dead (Huston novel), a 2005 pulp-noir / horror novel by Charlie Huston
 Already Dead: A California Gothic, a 1997 novel by Denis Johnson
 Already Dead (film), a 2008 film drama
 "Already Dead" (song), a song by Juice Wrld from the album Fighting Demons, a soundtrack for the documentary Juice Wrld: Into the Abyss
 "Already Dead", a song by the band Silverstein from the album Discovering the Waterfront
 "Already Dead", a song by Ronnie Radke from the mixtape Watch Me
 Already Dead, a 2021 album by Willy Mason